Raxco Software Inc. is a Gaithersburg, Maryland software company. Founded in 1978, the company's products have been sold internationally.

The company spun off one division as Axent Technologies; the latter was "acquired by venture capital firms in 1988." Meanwhile Raxco continued with its own product offerings. PerfectDisk became
its flagship software package.

Raxco transitioned from its 1980s
and 1990s VAX (VMS) and OpenVMS software product line, and did a Management buyout to become a private, independent company.

Interim ownerships
From the later 1990s thru the early 2000s, corporate ownership of the two organizations transitioned:
 Raxco spun off one division (Axent) 
 Axent Technologies Inc,
 Axent was acquired by Symantec
 Symantec dropped some of its acquisitions in 2001. At that point, the founders did a management buyout and got the company back again."

Raxco, which had retained its identity, then changed its course from VAX/VMS to the PC/Server world in 2003.

History
During the 1980s, using the collective name RAXCO Rabbit Software, the company marketed a series of nine software packages for the VAX:

Raxco's VAX product line was still active in the 1990s, even as it was building and expanding its PC Product line. By 2003 the PC desktop and server market became the company's focus.

Product line
Aside from PerfectDisk, the company also markets:
 PerfectUpdater - improves system stability/minimizes hardware conflicts by detecting/installing appropriate drivers for unknown devices
 PerfectRegistry - Fix registry errors that slow down booting up
 PerfectGuard - Blocks/removes spyware, helps protect privacy
 InstantRescue - quicker rollback/system restore
 PerfectFileRecovery - an advanced undelete tool

References

External links
 Company information

Software companies based in Maryland
Companies based in Gaithersburg, Maryland
Software companies of the United States
1978 establishments in Maryland
Software companies established in 1978
American companies established in 1978